Francesco Mainardi (born December 29, 1942) is an Italian physicist and mathematician.

Early life
Mainardi was born in Lugo, Italy, on December 29, 1942. He graduated from the University of Bologna in 1966 with a degree in theoretical physics.

Career 
Mainardi became a professor of mathematical physics at Bologna. From 1971 to 1973, he was a lecturer at the Marche Polytechnic University on rational mechanics. He teaches non-Gaussian stochastics and mathematics among other science-related subjects. He has offered courses on statistical mechanics and fractional calculus. From January 24–28, 2000, he worked for the Center for Mathematical Physics and Stochastic at the University of Aarhus, Denmark.

Publications
In 1982, he was the editor of Wave Propagation in Viscoelastic Media, which was published by Pitman Publishing in London. In September 1996, he and A. Carpinteri authored Scaling Laws and Fractality in Continuum Mechanics. A year later. Mainard and Carpintei co-edited Fractals and Fractional Calculus in Continuum Mechanics. He went on hiatus until 2010 when the Imperial College Press issued Fractional Calculus and Waves in Linear Viscoelasticity in London. A year later, he co-authored (with S. Rogosin), The Legacy of A.Ya. Khintchine's Work in Probability Theory.

Works abroad
He gave lectures abroad at institutions such as the Indian Institute of Science of Bangalore, International Centre of Mathematical Sciences of Palai in India, the Free University of Berlin. He worked at the Courant Institute of Mathematical Sciences in New York City and at the Institute of Oceanography of San Diego. He was a lecturer at the University of Sydney and then worked at the University of KwaZulu-Natal of South Africa. In Brazil, worked at the University of Campinas in applied mathematics.

References

1942 births
Living people
20th-century Italian physicists
Academic staff of the Indian Institute of Science
University of Bologna alumni
Academic staff of the University of Bologna
Academic staff of the University of Sydney
University of KwaZulu-Natal
People from Lugo, Emilia-Romagna